Doug or Douglas Rogers may refer to:
 Doug Rogers (American football) (born 1960), American football player
 Doug Rogers (judoka) (1941–2020), Canadian Olympic competitor in judo
 Douglas Rogers (writer) (born 1968), Zimbabwean journalist, travel writer and memoirist

See also
 Roger Douglas (born 1937), New Zealand politician